Elise Burgin and Rosalyn Fairbank were the defending champions but only Fairbank competed that year with Wendy Turnbull.

Fairbank and Turnbull lost in the quarterfinals to Jenny Byrne and Janine Tremelling.

Martina Navratilova and Pam Shriver won in the final 6–3, 3–6, 7–5 against Gabriela Sabatini and Helena Suková.

Seeds
Champion seeds are indicated in bold text while text in italics indicates the round in which those seeds were eliminated.

 Martina Navratilova /  Pam Shriver (champions)
 Gabriela Sabatini /  Helena Suková (final)
 Larisa Savchenko /  Natasha Zvereva (semifinals)
 Rosalyn Fairbank /  Wendy Turnbull (quarterfinals)

Draw

References
 1988 Virginia Slims of New England Doubles Draw

Virginia Slims of New England
1988 WTA Tour